The Albert Zahn House is located in Baileys Harbor, Wisconsin, United States. It was added to the National Register of Historic Places in 2000.

History
The house was built by folk artist Albert Zahn and his wife, Louise. Zahn displayed many of his bird carvings on the property and named it Bird's Park. Other carvings he displayed there include those of other animals and Biblical figures.

References

External links
The Bird House at Bird Park, photo, Wisconsin Historical Society
The Zahn Family with Randy Zahn, still photos of carvings by Caleb Whitney by the Baileys Harbor Historical Society, Sevastopol TV, September 12, 2013, 58:40 long

Further reading
 Albert Zahn Carvings at the Kohler Foundation
 Door Way: The People in the Landscape by Norbert Blei, Peoria, Illinois: The Ellis Press, 1981, section "Albert Zahn / The Man Who Carved Birds", pages 48-52; printed as a "Door County Profiles" column in the Door County Advocate, September 27, 1977

Houses in Door County, Wisconsin
Houses completed in 1924
Houses on the National Register of Historic Places in Wisconsin
National Register of Historic Places in Door County, Wisconsin